Chutz is a town in Saint Andrew Parish, Grenada.  It is located towards the center of the island, on its eastern side.

References

Populated places in Grenada
Saint Andrew Parish, Grenada